Hogarty is a surname. Notable people with the surname include:

Alexander Hogarty, American football player and coach
Philip Hogarty (1988–2008), Irish chess player
William P. Hogarty (1840–1914), American Civil War veteran

See also
Hogarty, Wisconsin